Connor Brown (born 6 August 1998) is a New Zealand professional racing cyclist, who currently rides for UCI WorldTeam .

Major results
Sources: 
2016
 UCI Junior Track World Championships
1st  Team pursuit
2019
 3rd Overall Tour de Limpopo
1st Stage 2
 3rd Trofeo Alcide Degasperi
2020
 6th Overall New Zealand Cycle Classic

Grand Tour general classification results timeline

References

External links

1998 births
Living people
New Zealand male cyclists
Sportspeople from Cape Town
21st-century New Zealand people